The electronic music group Tangerine Dream has released more than three hundred albums, singles, EPs and compilations since the group was formed in 1967.

Eras
Tangerine Dream's releases have been divided into several eras based on the record label of the time. Tangerine Dream's first releases were on the Ohr label. The Ohr logo was a pink ear, thus fans refer to this era as the Pink Years; this covers Electronic Meditation (1970) to Atem (1973). In 1974, the band switched to Virgin Records with the release of Phaedra, thus the Virgin Years. The switch to the Jive Records label with their blue logo was the start of the Blue Years beginning with Poland in 1984.

The Melrose Years started when Tangerine Dream switched to Peter Baumann's Private Music label, located on Melrose Avenue in Los Angeles; the first release was Optical Race (1988). This was a period of rapid line-up changes, beginning with the departure of Christopher Franke, and ending with the departure of Paul Haslinger and the introduction of Jerome Froese and Linda Spa. A switch to the Miramar label in Seattle gave the name Seattle Years with the release of Rockoon (1992).

Tangerine Dream moved to the Castle label in 1996 briefly before Edgar Froese created his own TDI label, thus this era is the TDI Years or sometimes the Millennium Years. In late 2005 the label was renamed Eastgate, giving rise to the Eastgate Years. In late 2014 Edgar Froese conceived of translating the current knowledge of quantum mechanics into sound, thus the Quantum Years and the release of Mala Kunia.

Series
The Dream Mixes series is a project initiated by Jerome Froese. The series has a dance music slant and primarily consists of remixes of other TD material. The Dante Trilogy is a musical interpretation of Dante's Divine Comedy. The Five Atomic Seasons series was commissioned by a Japanese businessman who survived the atomic bombings of both Nagasaki and Hiroshima. The Bootleg Box sets, the Bootmoon series and the Vault series are live concerts sourced from recordings; many were first released as part of the Tangerine Tree project.

Live and studio albums

Charted studio albums

Charted live albums

Other albums
Albums billed as live commonly include overdubs and original material added in studio. The extreme case is Live Miles, of which less than a third had been performed live at the time of its release. Given the fact that the band's live albums often consist of original music not available on any studio album, the distinction between studio and live albums is less useful with Tangerine Dream than with most bands.

Mini-albums and EPs

Singles

Soundtracks
{| class="wikitable sortable" style="width:100%"
! style="width:7%" | Recorded
! style="width:7%" | Released
! style="width:10%" | Type
! style="width:20%" | Album
! Notes
|-
| 1977 || 1977 || soundtrack || Sorcerer ||
 UK Albums Chart: No. 25
 US Billboard 200: No. 153
|-
| 1980 || 1981 || soundtrack || Thief ||
 UK Albums Chart: No. 43
 US Billboard 200: No. 115
|-
| 1982 || 1982 || soundtrack || Das Mädchen auf der Treppe || German Singles Chart: No. 13
|-
| 1983 || 1983 || soundtrack || Wavelength ||
|-
| 1983 || 1984 || soundtrack || Risky Business ||
|-
| 1983 || 1984 || soundtrack || Firestarter ||
|-
| 1983 || 1984 || soundtrack || Flashpoint ||
|-
| 1984 || 1985 || soundtrack || Heartbreakers ||
|-
| 1985 || 1986 || soundtrack || Legend ||
|-
| 1987 || 1987 || soundtrack || Three O'Clock High ||
|-
| 1987 || 1988 || soundtrack || Near Dark ||
|-
| 1987 || 1988 || soundtrack || Shy People ||
|-
| 1988 || 1989 || soundtrack || Miracle Mile ||
|-
| 1989 || 1989 || soundtrack || Destination Berlin ||
|-
| 1986 || 1991 || soundtrack || Canyon Dreams || Video certified Platinum by the RIAA
|-
| 1988 || 1991 || soundtrack || Dead Solid Perfect ||
|-
| 1984 || 1991 || soundtrack || The Park Is Mine ||
|-
| 1989 || 1991 || soundtrack || L'Affaire Wallraff (The Man Inside) ||
|-
| 1991 || 1991 || soundtrack || Rumpelstiltskin ||
|-
| 1987 || 1992 || soundtrack || Deadly Care ||
|-
| 1989 || 1994 || soundtrack || Catch Me If You Can ||
|-
| 1983 ||  ||  || The Keep ||
|-
| 1994 || 1996 || soundtrack || Zoning ||
|-
| 1996 || 1997 || soundtrack || Oasis ||
|-
| 1997 || 1997 || audio novel || Der Meteor ||
|-
| 1992–1998 || 1998 || soundtrack || The Hollywood Years Vol. 1 || unused soundtrack for dozens of films
|-
| 1992–1998 || 1998 || soundtrack || The Hollywood Years Vol. 2 || unused soundtrack for dozens of films
|-
| 1997 || 1998 || soundtrack || Transsiberia ||
|-
| 1999 || 1999 || soundtrack || What a Blast || Released as Architecture in Motion in 1999
|-
| 1999 || 1999 || soundtrack || Great Wall of China ||
|-
| 2003 || 2003 || soundtrack || Mota Atma ||
|-
| 2001–2002 || 2004 || soundtrack || L'Inferno || Series: Dante
|-
| 2013 || 2013 || soundtrack || The Music of Grand Theft Auto V: Volume 2 The Score || Co-composed with Woody Jackson, The Alchemist and Oh No
|-
| 2013 || 2013 || soundtrack || The Cinematographic Score: GTA5 || Contains Tangerine Dream's initial contributions sent to Rockstar Games for Grand Theft Auto V before inputs from other composers were addressed
|-
| 1982 || 2020 || soundtrack || The Soldier || Previously unreleased score to the 1982 film
|-
| 1981 || 2022 || soundtrack || Strange Behavior || Previously unreleased score to the 1981 film
|}

Videos

Sampler albums
Tangerine Dream tracks have appeared on a number of sampler albums. These particular samplers are unique in that they contain tracks that never appeared on any other official Tangerine Dream release, although some have been released on the Tangerine Tree fan project:

Compilations and sets

References

External Links
 

Discographies of German artists